David Elmer Jeremiah (February 25, 1934 – October 7, 2013) was a United States Navy admiral who served as the second vice chairman and also the acting chairman of the Joint Chiefs of Staff.  After his retirement from the Navy in February 1994, he worked in the field of investment banking.  He served as partner and President, CEO and later Chairman of Technology Strategies & Alliances Corporation, a strategic advisory and investment banking firm engaged primarily in the aerospace, defense, telecommunications, and electronics industries. During his military career Jeremiah earned a reputation as an authority on strategic planning, financial management and the policy implications of advanced technology.

Naval career
Jeremiah served four years as Vice Chairman of the Joint Chiefs of Staff for Generals Colin L. Powell and John M. Shalikashvili. He was a key player for both Chairmen in the transition to a post-Cold War military. Jeremiah was also the Commander in Chief of the United States Pacific Fleet from 1987 to 1991.

He commanded a task force, battle group and destroyer squadron in earlier tours in the Mediterranean. He served as commanding officer of the guided missile destroyer  from 1974 to 1976. Ashore, Jeremiah served as Director, Navy Program Planning and in financial planning positions on the staffs of the Secretary of Defense and Chief of Naval Operations.

Dates of rank

Awards and decorations

He also received the University of Oregon Pioneer Award for Distinguished Graduates.

Organizational affiliations
Jeremiah was Chairman of the Board of Directors of Wackenhut Services, Inc. and served on the Boards of Directors for Geobiotics, LLC, Todd Shipyards Corporation, ManTech International Corporation and the Board of Trustees for MITRE Corporation and In-Q-Tel and advisory boards for Northrop Grumman Corporation and the Jewish Institute for National Security Affairs.

In addition to his corporate responsibilities, Jeremiah served as a member of the President's Foreign Intelligence Advisory Board, the George Bush Presidential Library Advisory Council and a National Reconnaissance Office Advisory Panel.

Education
Jeremiah earned a bachelor's degree in Business Administration from the University of Oregon and a master's degree in Financial Management from George Washington University. He completed the Program for Management Development at Harvard Business School.

Death
Jeremiah died on October 7, 2013 at the Walter Reed National Military Medical Center in Bethesda, aged 79. He was buried at Arlington National Cemetery.

References

External links

A list of U.S. Pacific Fleet Commanders
 Tribute to Adm. David E. Jeremiah on his retirement from active duty
USNI U.S. Naval Institute
U.S. Dpt. of State |American Embassy |Canberra Australia |Admiral David E. Jeremiah AO, U.S.N. (Retired) Named Presidential Representative to the 60th Anniversary Ceremonies of the Battle of Coral Sea
Board of Trustees |Admiral David E. Jeremiah
The Jewish Institute for National Security Affairs
University of Oregon |awards
Profile – David E. Jeremiah

1934 births
2013 deaths
Military personnel from Portland, Oregon
Chairmen of the Joint Chiefs of Staff
Vice Chairmen of the Joint Chiefs of Staff
Joint Chiefs of Staff
United States Navy admirals
Recipients of the Defense Distinguished Service Medal
Recipients of the Navy Distinguished Service Medal
Recipients of the Distinguished Service Medal (US Army)
Recipients of the Air Force Distinguished Service Medal
Recipients of the Coast Guard Distinguished Service Medal
Recipients of the Legion of Merit
George Washington University School of Business alumni
Harvard Business School alumni
Alliant Techsystems
Mitre Corporation people
Grand Cordons of the Order of the Rising Sun
Order of National Security Merit members
Honorary Officers of the Order of Australia
University of Oregon alumni
American chief executives